Brigita Matić-Ljuba (born 31 January 1996) is a Croatian judoka who competes in international judo competitions. She is the 2014 Youth Olympic champion, a World Junior champion, two-time European Cadet champion and a three-time European Junior silver medalist. She is the younger sister of Barbara Matić.

References

External links
 

1996 births
Living people
Croatian female judoka
Youth Olympic gold medalists for Croatia
Judoka at the 2014 Summer Youth Olympics
21st-century Croatian women